Little Band Big Jazz is an album by trumpeter Conte Candoli's All Stars recorded in 1960 and released on Crown Records.

Following the success of pianist Vince Guaraldi's album, Jazz Impressions of Black Orpheus (1962), Crown reissued Little Band Big Jazz as Vince Guaraldi and the Conte Candoli All-Stars in 1964. New cover art featured a painting of Guaraldi in place of the group photo used on the original release.

Reception

AllMusic critic Scott Yanow noted: "While the solos are excellent, trumpeter Conte Candoli's six originals (two co-written with pianist Vince Guaraldi) are not particularly memorable. Their chord structures are comfortable for the musicians but none of the melodies will be remembered". Guaraldi biographer and historian Derrick Bang commented, "All in all, this is an engaging album, if in the old Big Band style."

Track listing

Personnel 
Conte Candoli – trumpet
Buddy Collette – tenor saxophone
Vince Guaraldi – piano
Leroy Vinnegar – double bass 
Stan Levey – drums

References 

Conte Candoli albums
1960 albums
Crown Records albums